Henderson is a major suburb of West Auckland, in the North Island of New Zealand. The suburb is located within the Henderson-Massey Local Board of the Waitākere Ward, one of the thirteen administrative divisions of Auckland Council.

Geography 

Henderson is located between the Waitākere Ranges to the west, and the Te Atatū Peninsula in the east. The area is within the catchment of Te Wai-o-Pareira / Henderson Creek, an estuarial arm of the upper Waitematā Harbour. The Opanuku, Oratia, Swanson, Momutu and Paremuka streams meet at Te Wai-o-Pareira / Henderson Creek, to the north of Henderson.

Between 3 and 5 million years ago, tectonic forces uplifted the Waitākere Ranges and central Auckland, while subsiding the Manukau and upper Waitematā Harbours. The land at Henderson is formed from Waitemata Group sandstone, which was previously found at the bottom of a deep sedimentary basin. Land close to Te Wai-o-Pareira / Henderson Creek and the Waitematā Harbour are formed from rhyolitic clays and peat, formed from eroding soil and interactions with the harbour. Prior to human contact, the Henderson area was home to broadleaf forests, dominated by pūriri, karaka, kohekohe and māhoe trees. The alluvial creek/harbour zone was favoured by kahikatea, pukatea and rātā, with tī kōuka (cabbage trees) flourishing in wetter sites.

History

Henderson is in the traditional rohe of Te Kawerau ā Maki, and the name Ōpanuku refers to the Opanuku Stream, traditionally known as Te Wai-ō-Panuku ("The Stream of Panuku"), Panuku being the name of one of the earliest Te Kawerau ā Maki ancestors. The lower Opanuku Stream area was called Waitaro, referring to the taro cultivations grown there.

The point where the Opanuku and Oratia Streams meet (the Tui Glen Reserve / Falls Park area) is the beginning of Te Wai-o-Pareira, also known as the Henderson Creek, and the point where the creek became navigable by waka. This point was strategically important to Te Kawerau ā Maki, and was the location of a small fortified pā known as Te Kōpua. Kōpūpāka was the name of a kāinga close to Te Kōpua, which was used as a temporary settlement by Ngāti Whātua during the Musket Wars in the 1820s, during a brief lull in conflict. After the Musket Wars, Te Kawerau ā Maki returned to the area in the 1830s, and most members chose to settle close to a defensive pā at Te Henga / Bethells Beach.

Henderson is named after early colonial settler Thomas Henderson, a Scottish immigrant who purchased land from Ngati Whatua in 1844 and established a timber mill on the banks of Te Wai-o-Pareira / Henderson Creek ca. 1847 to process the logs of kauri trees which were cut from the Henderson Valley and further upstream, from the eastern flanks of the Waitākere Ranges. The community which developed around the mill was known as Henderson's Mill, and later the Henderson's Mill Settlement. The first European settlers in the community were mill workers, who were joined gum diggers, farm workers and brick makers. In 1855, George Pirrit and his son William Pirrit bought land at Henderson adjacent to the Oratia Stream, which they dammed in order to operate a water turbine, manufacturing iron heel and toe plates for boots. In the following year, a hotel was opened on the town's main street.

The mill closed in the latter 1860s, and in 1875 the area was hit by a major flood, damaging crops and bridges near the settlement. The area became more prosperous in the 1880s, after the North Auckland Railway opened between Auckland and Helensville. When the Henderson railway station was opened, the name was displayed as Henderson Mill, with the possessive dropped. Overtime, goods to the area sent by rail began adopting this name, and eventually the settlement was referred to as Henderson. In the late 19th and early 20th centuries, Henderson was the location of a number of brick and pottery yards adjacent to Te Wai-o-Pareira / Henderson Creek. The major brick industries in West Auckland were located to the south, along the Whau River. In 1896, a community hall was built at Henderson, hosting concerts for the West Auckland area. This was destroyed by fire in 1924, and rebuilt in brick.

In 1907, Lebanese New Zealander Assid Abraham Corban developed a vineyard at Henderson. After the sale of alcohol was prohibited in Henderson during the temperance movement, Corban set up a depot at the border of the prohibition area on the eastern side of the railway tracks, in order to sell his projects.

By the 1920s, the Lincoln Road, Swanson Road and Sturgess Road areas had developed into orchards run primarily by Dalmatian families who immigrated to New Zealand, including the included Bilich (later White), Babich, Boric, Yelavich and Fredatovich families. During this time, the Te Wai-o-Pareira / Henderson Creek at Tui Glen Reserve had become a popular waterway for leisure and a site for pleasure boating. The first modern brick block of shops were built in the area in 1932. In the early 1930s, a kauri gum refinery was constructed on Station Road, however this closed down in 1936 after a market slump.

Amenities and attractions 

Henderson features a large shopping centre, WestCity Waitakere, with numerous other shops and large stores also located in the area. The West Wave Pool and Leisure Centre, owned by the Auckland Council, was built to host the Aquatics at the 1990 Commonwealth Games.

The Corban's Wine Estate and Corban Estate Arts Centre are both located in Henderson. The annual InterACT Disability Arts Festival is held at the gallery. At the northern end of Henderson, near the Lincoln Road motorway interchange, the Toroa, a historic ferry under restoration, is a well-known local landmark.

The Trusts Stadium attracts hundreds of thousands of visitors a year, hosting a range of events, including concerts, sporting events and community gatherings. The Trusts Stadium was completed in August 2004 and was opened by then Prime Minister Helen Clark the following month. It cost $28 million to complete but opened debt-free, with The Trusts providing $5 million, Waitakere City Council contributing $12.5 million and ASB Charitable Trusts providing $4.5 million.

Demographics

Henderson had a population of 8,706 at the 2018 New Zealand census, an increase of 777 people (9.8%) since the 2013 census, and an increase of 1,677 people (23.9%) since the 2006 census. There were 2,892 households, comprising 4,179 males and 4,533 females, giving a sex ratio of 0.92 males per female, with 1,704 people (19.6%) aged under 15 years, 1,830 (21.0%) aged 15 to 29, 3,636 (41.8%) aged 30 to 64, and 1,542 (17.7%) aged 65 or older.

Ethnicities were 48.2% European/Pākehā, 15.3% Māori, 22.2% Pacific peoples, 26.8% Asian, and 3.6% other ethnicities. People may identify with more than one ethnicity.

The percentage of people born overseas was 40.2, compared with 27.1% nationally.

Although some people chose not to answer the census's question about religious affiliation, 37.0% had no religion, 44.6% were Christian, 1.2% had Māori religious beliefs, 4.3% were Hindu, 3.1% were Muslim, 1.4% were Buddhist and 1.9% had other religions.

Of those at least 15 years old, 1,272 (18.2%) people had a bachelor's or higher degree, and 1,422 (20.3%) people had no formal qualifications. 666 people (9.5%) earned over $70,000 compared to 17.2% nationally. The employment status of those at least 15 was that 3,234 (46.2%) people were employed full-time, 747 (10.7%) were part-time, and 333 (4.8%) were unemployed.

Politics

Local government

From 1876 until 1946, Henderson was administered by the Waitemata County, a large rural county north and west of the city of Auckland. In 1946, the area split from the county, forming the Henderson Borough Council. In 1989, the borough was merged into the Waitakere City. Waitakere City Council was amalgamated into Auckland Council in November 2010.

Within the Auckland Council, Henderson is a part of the Henderson-Massey local government area governed by the Henderson-Massey Local Board. It is a part of the Waitākere ward, which elects two councillors to the Auckland Council.

List of borough mayors

1946–1956 William Gibb Blacklock
1956–1965 Frederick George William Wilsher
1965–1974 Reginald Alfred Keeling
1974–1989 Assid Khaleel Corban

Member of Parliament 
The Local Member of Parliament for Henderson is Phil Twyford, the MP for Te Atatū, who keeps an office in the suburb.

Education

The first school in Henderson began operating in 1873, held in the library of Henderson's Mill.

Henderson High School is a secondary (years 9-13) school with a roll of  students. The high school was founded in 1953

Henderson School was founded in 1873 and Henderson South School in 1967.

Holy Cross School, a Catholic primary school, is a full primary (years 1-8) school with a roll of  students. It celebrated its 75th jubilee in 2007.

All these schools are coeducational.

Transport 
The Western Line runs through the suburb, with Henderson Railway Station being adjacent to the town centre. 
Henderson Railway Station is adjacent to the main shopping centre and a bus interchange. The suburb is also served by the Sturges Road Railway Station. Motorway access is provided via the interchange at Lincoln Road, in the adjacent suburb of Lincoln. The main walkways and cycleways of the Project Twin Streams go through the suburb.

References

Print references

External links
Photographs of Henderson held in Auckland Libraries' heritage collections.

1840s establishments in New Zealand
Suburbs of Auckland
Henderson-Massey Local Board Area
West Auckland, New Zealand